Acacia empelioclada is a shrub of the genus Acacia and the subgenus Pulchellae that is endemic to an area along the south coast of south western Australia.

Description
There are three to ten pairs of pinnules except for the proximal pinnae of multijugate leaves that have two to four pairs. It blooms from July to October and produces yellow-cream flowers. The simple inflorescences occur in groups of one to two in the axils and have spherical flower-heads containing 25 to 43 cream to pale yellow coloured flowers.

Taxonomy
It belongs to the Acacia browniana group of wattles but resemble both Acacia leioderma and Acacia lateriticola.

Distribution
It is native to an area along the south coast in the Goldfields-Esperance and Great Southern regions of Western Australia where it is commonly situated in moist areas, on low rises and rocky hillsides growing in gravelly sandy soils over and around areas of laterite. The range of the plant extends from around Cape Riche in the west to the Fitzgerald River National Park as a part of mallee heath or mixed scrub communities.

See also
 List of Acacia species

References

empelioclada
Endemic flora of Southwest Australia
Acacias of Western Australia
Taxa named by Bruce Maslin
Plants described in 1975